Fritillaria ussuriensis is a species of flowering plant in the lily family Liliaceae, native to Korea, the Primorye Region of Russia, and northeastern China (Heilongjiang, Jilin, Liaoning).

It is a bulb-forming perennial up to 100 cm tall. The flowers are pendent, nodding, bell-shaped, brownish-purple with yellowish markings.

References

External links
Calphotos, University of Californiea @ Berkeley, Fritillaria ussuriensis  numerous color photos
Plantarium  Плантариум, Fritillaria ussuriensis Maxim. Описание таксона in Russian with color photos
Fritillaria Group, Alpine Garden Society, Fritillaria species T-Z photos of several species including Fritillaria ussuriensis

ussuriensis
Flora of Manchuria
Flora of the Russian Far East
Flora of Korea
Plants described in 1882